Resource refers to all the materials available in our environment which are technologically accessible, economically feasible and culturally sustainable and help us to satisfy our needs and wants. Resources can broadly be classified upon their availability — they are classified into renewable and non-renewable resources. They can also be classified as actual and potential on the basis of the level of development and use, on the basis of origin they can be classified as biotic and abiotic, and on the basis of their distribution, as ubiquitous and localised (private, community-owned, national and international resources). An item becomes a resource with time and developing technology. The benefits of resource utilization may include increased wealth, proper functioning of a system, or enhanced well-being. From a human perspective, a natural resource is anything obtained from the environment to satisfy human needs and wants. From a broader biological or ecological perspective, a resource satisfies the needs of a living organism (see biological resource). 

The concept of resources has been developed across many established areas of work, in economics, biology and ecology, computer science, management, and human resources for example - linked to the concepts of competition, sustainability, conservation, and stewardship. In application within human society, commercial or non-commercial factors require resource allocation through resource management.

The concept of a resource can also be tied to the direction of leadership over resources, this can include the things leaders have responsibility for over the human resources, with management, help, support or direction such as in charge of a professional group, technical experts, innovative leaders, archiving expertise, academic management, association management, business management, healthcare management, military management, public administration, spiritual leadership and social networking administrator.

individuals exploit the same amount of resource per unit biomass) to absolutely size-asymmetric (the largest individuals exploit all the available resource). The degree of size asymmetry has major effects on the structure and diversity of ecological communities, e.g. in plant communities size-asymmetric competition for light has stronger effects on diversity compared with competition for soil resources. The degree of size asymmetry has major effects on the structure and diversity of ecological communities.

Economic versus biological 

There are three fundamental differences between economic versus ecological views: 1) the economic resource definition is human-centered (anthropocentric) and the biological or ecological resource definition is nature-centered (biocentric or ecocentric); 2) the economic view includes desire along with necessity, whereas the biological view is about basic biological needs; and 3) economic systems are based on markets of currency exchanged for goods and services, whereas biological systems are based on natural processes of growth, maintenance, and reproduction.

Computer resources

A computer resource is any physical or virtual component of limited availability within a computer or information management system. Computer resources include means for input, processing, output, communication, and storage.

Natural

Natural resources are derived from the environment. Many natural resources are essential for human survival, while others are used for satisfying human desire. Conservation is management of natural resources with the goal of sustainability. Natural resources may be further classified in different ways.

Resources can be categorized on the basis of origin:
 Abiotic resources comprise non-living things (e.g., land, water, air and minerals such as gold, iron, copper, silver).
 Biotic resources are obtained from the biosphere. Forests and their products, animals, birds and their products, fish and other marine organisms are important examples. Minerals such as coal and petroleum are sometimes included in this category because they were formed from fossilized organic matter, though over long periods of time.

Natural resources are also categorized based on the stage of development:
 Potential resources are known to exist and may be used in the future. For example, petroleum may exist in many parts of India and Kuwait that have sedimentary rocks, but until the time it is actually drilled out and put into use, it remains a potential resource.
 Actual resources are those that have been surveyed, their quantity  and quality determined, and are being used in present times. For example, petroleum and natural gas is actively being obtained from the Mumbai High Fields. The development of an actual resource, such as wood processing depends upon the technology available and the cost involved. That part of the actual resource that can be developed profitably with available technology is known as a reserve resource, while that part that can not be developed profitably because of lack of technology is known as a stock resource.

Natural resources can be categorized on the basis of renewability:
 Non-renewable resources are formed over very long geological periods. Minerals and fossils are included in this category. Since their rate of formation is extremely slow, they cannot be replenished, once they are depleted. Even though metals can be recycled and reused, whereas petroleum and gas cannot, they are still considered non-renewable resources.
 Renewable resources, such as forests and fisheries, can be replenished or reproduced relatively quickly. The highest rate at which a resource can be used sustainably is the sustainable yield. Some resources, such as sunlight, air, and wind, are called perpetual resources because they are available continuously, though at a limited rate. Their quantity is not affected by human consumption. Many renewable resources can be depleted by human use, but may also be replenished, thus maintaining a flow. Some of these, such as agricultural crops, take a short time for renewal; others, such as water, take a comparatively longer time, while still others, such as forests, take even longer.

Dependent upon the speed and quantity of consumption, overconsumption can lead to depletion or total and everlasting destruction of a resource. Important examples are agricultural areas, fish and other animals, forests, healthy water and soil, cultivated and natural landscapes. Such conditionally renewable resources are sometimes classified as a third kind of resource, or as a subtype of renewable resources. Conditionally renewable resources are presently subject to excess human consumption and the only sustainable long term use of such resources is within the so-called zero ecological footprint, where in human use less than the Earth's ecological capacity to regenerate.

Natural resources are also categorized based on distribution:
 Ubiquitous resources are found everywhere (for example air, light, and water).
 Localized resources are found only in certain parts of the world (for example metal ores and geothermal power).

Actual vs. potential natural resources are distinguished as follows:
 Actual resources are those resources whose location and quantity are known and we have the technology to exploit and use them.
 Potential resources are the ones of which we have insufficient knowledge or we do not have the technology to exploit them at present.

On the basis of ownership, resources can be classified as individual, community, national, and international.

Labour or human resources
In economics, labor or human resources refers to the human effort in the production of goods and rendering of services. Human resources can be defined in terms of skills, energy, talent, abilities, or knowledge.

In a project management context, human resources are those employees responsible for undertaking the activities defined in the project plan.

Capital or infrastructure
In social studies, capital refers to already-produced durable goods used in production of goods or services. In essence, capital refers to human-made resources created using knowledge and expertise based on utility or perceived value. Common examples of capital include buildings, machinery, railways, roads, and ships. As resources, capital goods may or may not be significantly consumed, though they may depreciate in the production process and they are typically of limited capacity or unavailable for use by others.

Tangible versus intangible 
Whereas, tangible resources such as equipment have an actual physical existence, intangible resources such as corporate images, brands and patents, and other intellectual properties exist in abstraction.

Use and sustainable development 
Typically resources cannot be consumed in their original form, but rather through resource development they must be processed into more usable commodities and usable things. The demand for resources is increasing as economies develop. There are marked differences in resource distribution and associated economic inequality between regions or countries, with developed countries using more natural resources than developing countries. Sustainable development is a pattern of resource use, that aims to meet human needs while preserving the environment. Sustainable development means that we should exploit our resources carefully to meet our present requirement without compromising the ability of future generations to meet their own needs. The practice of the three R's – reduce, reuse and recycle must be followed in order to save and extend the availability of resources.

Various problems relate to the usage of resources:
 Environmental degradation
 Over-consumption
 Resource curse
 Resource depletion
 Tragedy of the commons
 Myth of superabundance

Various benefits can result from the wise usage of resources:
 Economic growth
 Ethical consumerism
 Prosperity
 Quality of life
 Sustainability
 Wealth

See also
 Natural resource management
 Resource-based view
 Waste management

References

External links 

 
Resource economics
Ecology